Penparc (also known as Penyparc) is a village in Ceredigion, Wales, on the A487 road  northeast of Cardigan.

The surrounding land is principally used for cattle grazing although the significant glacial sand deposits are also commercially used as a source of  sand and gravel.

To the east of the village, near a prominent conical hill, is the site of the Battle of Crug Mawr, fought in 1136.

References

Villages in Ceredigion